Naqil al-Aqab is a sub-district located in Hubaysh District, Ibb Governorate, Yemen. Naqil al-Aqab had a population of 4683 according to the 2004 census.

References 

Sub-districts in Hubaysh District